The 1951 French Grand Prix was a Formula One motor race held at Reims-Gueux on 1 July 1951. It was race 4 of 8 in the 1951 World Championship of Drivers and was won by Juan Manuel Fangio and Luigi Fagioli driving an Alfa Romeo. It was the first of three occasions where two drivers would be credited with a Grand Prix win after sharing a car.

The race, which also carried the honorific title of European Grand Prix, saw the World Championship debuts of Aldo Gordini, André Simon and Onofre Marimón. Fagioli's victory, his first in a World Championship race, made him the oldest driver to win a World Championship Grand Prix, a record he still holds.

This race also holds the record for the longest Formula One Grand Prix in terms of total distance needed to cover. 77 laps of the 4.856 mile Reims-Gueux circuit totaled to 373.961 miles.

Report
About 10 laps into the race, the engine in Fangio's car began misfiring, so he stopped at the pits to have the magneto changed, but only completed one further lap before stopping again. Around this time, the gearbox in Ascari's Ferrari had broken, and he retired, although he took over the car of González, who had been pushing very hard. When Fagioli came in for his fuel stop, the team ordered Fagioli and Fangio to swap cars; Fagioli's car was running healthily whereas Fangio's car had multiple mechanical problems. Fuel stops and problems for the Ferraris enabled Fangio to make his way into the lead and win the race, with Ascari in González's original car finishing 2nd, 52 seconds behind. Fagioli, in Fangio's original car, finished 11th, 22 laps behind. Fagioli, a veteran racing driver who had been racing Grand Prix cars since the 1920s and known for his fiery temperament was so furious over handing his car over to Fangio that he quit Grand Prix racing on the spot; he only raced this one championship race in 1951 and had not competed at the previous rounds at Bern and Spa.

Entries

 — Juan Manuel Fangio qualified and drove 15 laps of the race in the #4 Alfa Romeo. Luigi Fagioli took over the car for a further 40 laps.
 — Luigi Fagioli qualified and drove 20 laps of the race in the #8 Alfa Romeo. Juan Manuel Fangio took over the car for the remaining 57 laps of the race.
 — José Froilán González qualified and drove 35 laps of the race in the #14 Ferrari. Alberto Ascari, whose own vehicle had already retired, took over the car for the remaining 42 laps of the race.
 — Piero Taruffi and Prince Bira both withdrew from the event prior to practice.
 — Reg Parnell qualified and drove the entire race in the #26 Ferrari. Brian Shawe-Taylor practiced in the car, but took no part in the race proper.
 — Eugène Chaboud qualified and drove the entire race in the #44 Talbot-Lago. Lucien Vincent, named substitute driver for the car, was not used during the Grand Prix.

Classification

Qualifying

Race

Notes
 – Includes 1 point for fastest lap

Shared drives
 Car #8: Fagioli (first 20 laps) then Fangio (57 laps). They shared the points for the win (Fangio scored one extra point for setting the fastest race lap).
 Car #14: Gonzalez (first 35 laps) then Ascari (42 laps). They shared the points for 2nd position.
 Car #4: Fangio (first 15 laps) then Fagioli (40 laps). When Fagioli rejoined the race in Fangio's car he was already 20 laps behind.

Championship standings after the race 
Drivers' Championship standings

 Note: Only the top five positions are listed. Only the best 4 results counted towards the Championship.

References
 

French
French Grand Prix
European Grand Prix
1951 in French motorsport
French